The Lakeview Gusher was an eruption of hydrocarbons from a pressurized oil well in the Midway-Sunset Oil Field in Kern County, California, in 1910.  It created the largest accidental oil spill in history, lasting 18 months and releasing  of crude oil.

Midway-Sunset was one of the largest oil reserves in the United States.  When drilling commenced, the Lakeview Oil Company expected natural gas and a small amount of oil.  Instead, there was a large blowout which overloaded storage tanks.

Its site is located about a half-mile (800 m) east of the Taft–Maricopa Highway, California Route 33, marked by a Caltrans guide sign and a bronze plaque designated as California Historical Landmark number 485.

Background
The Lakeview Oil Company, organized by Julius Fried, R.D. Wade, F.E. Dunlap, and Charles F. Off started drilling at its Number One well on 1 January 1909. According to legend, Fried had picked the spot because of an assumption that clumps of red grass indicated good oil land. Initially only natural gas was found. As work continued the company exhausted funds and partnered with the Union Oil Company, which wanted to build storage tanks there.

Early twentieth-century drilling technology lacked such modern safety features as blowout preventers. An estimated  escaped before the gusher was brought under control in September 1911.

In spite of these efforts, less than half of the 9.4 million barrels released during the gusher's 544 days were saved. The rest evaporated or seeped into the ground. The fact that the oil field never caught fire is considered a "miracle."

California Historical Landmark 
The California Historical Landmark plaque reads:

NO. 485 LAKEVIEW GUSHER 1 - America's most spectacular gusher blew in here on March 14, 1910. Initially 18,000 barrels per day, the flow later reached an uncontrolled peak of 100,000 barrels per day, completely destroying the derrick. This Union Oil Company well produced nine million barrels of oil in 18 months.  Marker date of registration August 7, 1951.

See also
 List of oil spills (in reverse chronological order)
 Largest oil spills in history
 California Historical Landmarks in Kern County
California Historical Landmark

References

External links

 The Lakeview Gusher site images at The Center for Land Use Interpretation

Oil spills in the United States
1910 in California
History of Kern County, California
Oil fields in Kern County, California
Petroleum in California
California Historical Landmarks
1910 in the environment